The Phoenix is a ship built by Hjorne & Jakobsen at Frederikshavn, Denmark in 1929, originally as an Evangelical Mission Schooner.

Missionary and cargo ship
Twenty years later she retired from missionary work and carried cargo until her engine room was damaged by fire. In 1974 she was bought by new owners who converted her into a Brigantine before being purchased by Square Sail in 1988. A first aid over-haul enabled her to sail back to the UK where she underwent a complete refit.

Appearances in films

Caravel Santa Maria
During 1991 she was converted to the 15th century Caravel Santa Maria for Ridley Scott's film 1492: Conquest of Paradise. The ship was known as Santa Maria until, in 1996, due to increasing demand for period square-riggers, she was converted into a 2 masted Brig and reverted to her original name Phoenix of Dell Quay.

Hornblower Series 3
Phoenix of Dell Quay was used as the ship Retribution in the Hornblower Series 3.

Film credits 

Film credits include:

Hornblower Series III
Voyage of Discovery
Moll Flanders
Frenchman's Creek
The Scarlet Pimpernel
Voyage of the Dawn Treader (BBC's Chronicles of Narnia TV Series)
In the Heart of the Sea

See also
List of schooners

References

Brigs
Schooners
Individual sailing vessels
Brigantines
1929 ships
Missionary ships
Ships built in Fredrikstad